Adrián Emmanuel Martínez (born 2 July 1992) is an Argentine footballer who plays as a forward for Instituto.

Club career
Born in Campana, Buenos Aires Province, Martínez never represented any clubs during his youth setup (except from a year at Villa Dálmine at the age of 17). He played for hometown amateurs Club Las Acacias (which was presided by his mother) while working as a waste collector and bricklayer; at the former job, he was dismissed from his company after suffering a motorcycle accident.

In 2014, after his brother was shot, Martínez was arrested after being accused of burning and robbing the aggressor's home. He spent six months in jail until he could prove his innocence. After leaving prison, he returned to his first club Las Acacias before trialling at Primera C Metropolitana side Defensores Unidos in January 2015, subsequently joining the club but initially playing without receiving wages.

In 2017, after scoring 21 goals for Defensores, Martínez joined Primera B Metropolitana side Atlanta. He scored 15 goals during his only season at the club, netting against Primera División side Belgrano and River Plate in the Copa Argentina.

On 18 June 2018, Martínez moved abroad and joined Paraguayan Primera División club Sol de América. He was the club's top goalscorer with 12 goals, notably scoring braces against Olimpia (twice) and 3 de Febrero.

Libertad
On 18 December 2018, Martínez signed for Libertad. The following 13 February, he scored a hat-trick in a 5–1 Copa Libertadores home rout of The Strongest.

Cerro Porteño (loan)
On 1 July 2021, it was informed that Martinez would be loaned by Libertad to Cerro Porteño for the second half of the year. The loan deal was announced for one year.

References

External links 
 
 

1992 births
Living people
People from Campana, Buenos Aires
Argentine footballers
Association football forwards
Defensores Unidos footballers
Club Atlético Atlanta footballers
Instituto footballers
Argentine Primera División players
Paraguayan Primera División players
Club Sol de América footballers
Club Libertad footballers
Cerro Porteño players
Campeonato Brasileiro Série A players
Coritiba Foot Ball Club players
Argentine expatriate footballers
Argentine expatriate sportspeople in Paraguay
Expatriate footballers in Paraguay
Argentine expatriate sportspeople in Brazil
Expatriate footballers in Brazil
Sportspeople from Buenos Aires Province